The 2011 F1600 Championship Series season was the inaugural season for the F1600 Championship Series. Bill Valet took the championship over Tim Kautz in the final round.

Drivers and teams

Race calendar and results

Championship standings

References

External links
 Official website

F1600 Championship Series
F1600 Championship Series seasons